The 2013 New Zealand National Rugby Sevens Tournament known as the Pub Charity Sevens will be hosted in Queenstown, New Zealand, on the 12 & 13 January 2013. It will be the 10th and final year Queenstown has hosted the event, with matches to be played at the Queenstown Recreational Ground and Jack Reid Park in Arrowtown. Sixteen men's provincial teams have qualified to compete in the annual national tournament following three regional tournaments (Southern, Central and Northern regions) in November and December.

Format
Teams from the 26 Provincial Unions have to qualify to attend at the National Event in Queenstown. The teams are divided into pools of four teams, who play a round-robin within the pool. The top two teams in each pool advanced to the Cup competition. The four quarterfinal losers dropped into the bracket for the Plate. The Bowl was contested by the third- and fourth-place finishers in each pool, with the losers in the Bowl quarterfinals dropping into the bracket for the Shield.

Qualifying
2013 Pub Charity Rugby Sevens qualifying began on the 24 November 2012 in Timaru, where 16 teams earned a place in the tournament, this automatically qualified them for the event in Queenstown.

Southern Region
Otago defeated Canterbury 34-21 in the men's Final to claim the Tofa Shield.  Canterbury, Tasman, Southland and tournament hosts South Canterbury have all qualified for the men's National Sevens for 2013. Otago are not required to qualify given they host the Nationals in Queenstown but they won the event and so it was down to the other 3 semi-finalists plus the winner of the 5th/6th playoff.

Northern Region
Of the eight men’s teams competing, there are six spots up for grabs for nationals and with the Auckland Barbarians not eligible to qualify it means just one team will miss out. Auckland will host the Northern Region National Sevens Qualifying tournament
at the Waitemata rugby Club.

Waikato, North Harbour, Auckland, Counties Manukau, Bay of Plenty and Northland all qualified for 2013. Just one team missed out. That was Thames Valley this year, who lost their 6th v 7th playoff to Northland 15-10.

Central Region
The Men’s competition will follow a cross pool structure with teams being split into two pools of three, each team will play all teams from the opposing pool to develop a ranking system for playoffs. Pools were selected based on official rankings from the 2012 National sevens held in Queenstown.

Hawke’s Bay, Manawatu, Taranaki, Wairarapa Bush and Wellington all qualified for the men's 2013 Pub Charity Sevens with Horowhenua Kapiti missing out after finishing 6th.

Pool stage
The first round, or pool stage, saw the 16 teams divided into four pools of four teams. Each pool was a round-robin of six games, where each team played one match against each of the other teams in the same pool. Teams were awarded three points for a win, two points for a draw and one for a defeat.

The teams finishing in the top two of each pool advanced to the cup quarterfinals.

Pld = matches played, W = matches won, D = draws, L = losses, TF = tries for, PF = match points for, PA = match points against, +/− = sum total of points for/against, Pts = pool points

Pool A

Pool B

Pool C

Pool D

Knockout stage

Shield

Bowl

Plate

Cup

References

 "Waikato suffer surprise losses at national sevens" Fairfax NZ News, 13 January 2013

External links
 Official site

2013 in New Zealand rugby union
New Zealand National Rugby Sevens Tournament